John Wilson (born 2 July 1978) is a former France international rugby league footballer who last played for the Catalans Dragons in the Super League. Wilson previously played for the Parramatta Eels and the Wests Tigers in the National Rugby League (NRL).

Background
Wilson was born in Coffs Harbour, New South Wales, Australia.

Playing career
Wilson was one of the most experienced campaigners in the fledgling Dragons outfit. Nicknamed 'Sergeant' by English Dragons followers after the Dad's Army character, he was a popular figure with fans.

Wilson was named in the France squad for the 2008 Rugby League World Cup.

Career highlights 
Junior Club: Wentworthville
First Grade Debut: Round 22, Parramatta v New Zealand Warriors at Ericsson Stadium, 30 June 2000
First Grade Record: 65 appearances scoring 30 tries

References

External links

Super League profile

1978 births
Living people
Australian rugby league players
Catalans Dragons players
France national rugby league team players
Parramatta Eels players
Rugby league centres
Rugby league players from Coffs Harbour
Wests Tigers players